The WWE Year-End Awards is a concept used by WWE, where awards, similar to the Academy and Grammy Awards, are given to professional wrestlers at the end of the year who have performed on Raw and SmackDown. Introduced in 2018, there have been two editions of the concept. In the first edition, the winners were voted by fans, while for the second, WWE picked the winner themselves. Previously, wrestlers from Raw and SmackDown had been rewarded Slammy Awards between 1986 and 2015.

Winners and nominees

2018 awards 
The 2018 WWE Year-End Awards were revealed on December 23, 2018, on WWE's Instagram Stories. The results were voted by fans.

2019 awards 
The 2019 WWE Year-End Awards were announced on December 24, 2019, on WWE Backstage, with Renee Young, Booker T, Christian, Maria Menounos and Ember Moon as the hosts. This time, WWE picked the winners themselves. The reveals also featured nominees, although no previous announcements had been made about who was in contention for the awards.

Winners are listed first, highlighted in boldface.

See also
 List of professional wrestling awards
 NXT Year-End Award
 List of Pro Wrestling Illustrated awards
 List of Wrestling Observer Newsletter awards

References

Professional wrestling awards
Awards established in 2018
WWE lists